There are several islands scattered around the coastline of Cornwall. The majority are small islets, except the Isles of Scilly which is an inhabited archipelago situated 20 miles south-west of Lands End.

Isles of Scilly

Islands
You can help by expanding this list
St Michael's Mount
Looe Island
Godrevy Island 
Eddystone Rocks
Towan Island, Newquay
Asparagus Island
Mullion Island
St Clement's Isle, Mousehole

Devon Islands often confused as Cornish
Lundy
Drake's Island
The Mewstone Wembury

Rocks and Outcrops
You can help by expanding this list
Bawden Rocks
The Brisons
Cannis Rock Gribben Head
Wolf Rock
Longships
Seven Stones
Runnel Stone
The Manacles
Udder Rock Lantivet Bay
The Carracks
Welloe Rock Rinsey
Gulland Rock
The Mouls Pentire
Newland Rock Pentire
Killyvarder Rock Par
The Gwineas Gorran Haven
Gull Rock Nare Head
The Ranneys Looe Island

References

Islands
 
Cornwall, islands